Saxe-Altenburg was one of the Saxon duchies held by the Ernestine branch of the House of Wettin in present-day Thuringia. It was one of the smallest of the German states with an area of 1323 square kilometers and a population of 207,000 (1905) of whom about one fifth resided in the capital, Altenburg. The territory of the duchy consisted of two non-contiguous territories separated by land belonging to the Principality of Reuss. Its economy was based on agriculture, forestry, and small industry. The state had a constitutional monarchical form of government with a parliament composed of thirty members chosen by male taxpayers over 25 years of age.

History

The duchy had its origins in the medieval Burgraviate of Altenburg in the Imperial Pleissnerland (Terra Plisensis), a possession of the Wettin Margraves of Meissen since 1243. Upon a partition treaty of 1485, Altenburg fell to Ernst, Elector of Saxony, the progenitor of the Ernestine Wettins. After the Division of Erfurt in 1572 among Duke Johann Wilhelm of Saxony and his nephews, Altenburg fell to his Duchy of Saxe-Weimar.

When Johann Wilhelm's son and successor Friedrich Wilhelm I died in 1602, the Duchy of Saxe-Weimar passed to his younger brother Johann II. In 1603 Frederick William's eldest son Johann Philipp received the newly created Duchy of Saxe-Altenburg as compensation. It was an Imperial State in its own right, with a vote in the Reichstag, for much of the 17th century until the extinction of its ruling line in 1672 when it was inherited by Ernest I the Pious, the Duke of Saxe-Gotha, who had married the heiress.

Saxe-Altenburg thereafter remained part of Saxe-Gotha-Altenburg until the extinction of that house in 1825, when Gotha and Altenburg were divided up, with Gotha going to the Duke of Saxe-Coburg-Saalfeld and Altenburg to the Duke of Saxe-Hildburghausen, who in exchange gave up Hildburghausen to the Duke of Saxe-Meiningen. This family ruled the duchy until the end of the monarchies in the course of the German Revolution of 1918–19. The succeeding Free State of Saxe-Altenburg was incorporated into the new state of Thuringia in 1920.

Saxe-Altenburg had an area of 1,323 km2 (510 sq. mi.) and a population of 207,000 (1905). Its capital was Altenburg.

The Saxe-Altenburg line became extinct following the death of Prince George Moritz in 1991. The leadership of the house passed to Michael, head of the genealogically more senior house of Saxe-Weimar-Eisenach.

Dukes of Saxe-Altenburg

Elder line
 Johann Philipp, Duke of Saxe-Altenburg (1603–1639)
 Friedrich Wilhelm II, Duke of Saxe-Altenburg (1639–1669)
 Friedrich Wilhelm III, Duke of Saxe-Altenburg (1669–1672)
Line extinct, inherited by Saxe-Gotha, thereupon Saxe-Gotha-Altenburg

Junior line
 Frederick, Duke of Saxe-Altenburg (1826–1834) (Previously Duke of Saxe-Hildburghausen)
 Joseph, Duke of Saxe-Altenburg (1834–1848)
 Georg, Duke of Saxe-Altenburg (1848–1853)
 Ernst I, Duke of Saxe-Altenburg (1853–1908)
 Ernst II, Duke of Saxe-Altenburg (1908–1918)

Heads of the Ducal House of Saxe-Altenburg, post monarchy
 Ernst II, Duke of Saxe-Altenburg (1918–1955)
 Georg Moritz, Hereditary Prince of Saxe-Altenburg (1955–1991)

In 1991 the Saxe-Altenburg line became extinct in the male line. Its representation was merged with the one of Saxe-Weimar-Eisenach.

Two branches descend from duke Ernest the Pious, the father of the progenitor of the Saxe-Altenburg branch: Saxe-Meiningen and Saxe-Coburg and Gotha; according to old Wettin family law, they would have divided the actual territories between them (as happened to Gotha and Altenburg in 1826), the Western part for Saxe-Meiningen, of which it was a territorial continuum, and the Eastern part, with the capital city of Altenburg, for Saxe-Coburg and Gotha.

Secondary residences of the Dukes of Saxe-Altenburg

See also
 Ernestine duchies

Notes

References

External links

 Herzogtum Sachsen-Altenburg

 
 
1602 establishments in the Holy Roman Empire
Duchy of Saxe-Altenburg
Altenburg
House of Wettin
States and territories disestablished in 1918
States and territories established in 1602
States of the German Confederation
States of the German Empire
States of the North German Confederation
States of the Weimar Republic